Hot R&B/Hip-Hop Songs is a chart published by Billboard that ranks the top-performing songs in the United States in African-American-oriented musical genres; the chart has undergone various name changes since its launch in 1942 to reflect the evolution of such genres.  In 1966, it was published under the title Top Selling Rhythm & Blues Singles through the issue dated April 2 and Top Selling R&B Singles thereafter.  During that year, 20 different singles topped the chart, based on playlists submitted by radio stations and surveys of retail sales outlets.

In the issue of Billboard dated January 1, James Brown was at number one with "I Got You (I Feel Good)", the song's fifth week in the top spot.  It was displaced the following week by "A Sweet Woman Like You" by Joe Tex, but returned to the top of the chart for one final week in the issue dated January 15.  Many of the year's chart-toppers were released on the Motown label, including singles by Stevie Wonder, the Temptations, the Supremes and the Four Tops.  Motown is regarded as one of the most successful and influential labels of the 20th century and as having brought unprecedented levels of mainstream success to black music.  The Temptations were the year's most successful act, achieving four chart-toppers with "Get Ready", "Ain't Too Proud to Beg", "Beauty Is Only Skin Deep" and "(I Know) I'm Losing You", which spent a cumulative total of sixteen weeks in the top spot, the highest figure for any act.  "Ain't Too Proud to Beg" spent eight non-consecutive weeks at number one, the greatest length of time spent in the top spot by a song.  The longest unbroken run at number one was seven weeks, achieved by Wilson Pickett's "634-5789 (Soulsville, U.S.A.)".

In addition to the Temptations, four other acts achieved more than one number one during 1966.  James Brown gained his second chart-topper of the year in June with "It's a Man's Man's Man's World".  Wilson Pickett topped the chart for seven weeks in March and April with "634-5789 (Soulsville, U.S.A.)" and for a single week in September with "Land of a Thousand Dances",  the Supremes spent time at number one in the last quarter of the year with both "You Can't Hurry Love" and "You Keep Me Hangin' On", and Stevie Wonder reached the peak position with both "Uptight (Everything's Alright)" and his recording of Bob Dylan's song "Blowin' in the Wind".  Artists who topped the chart for the first time in 1966 included Rock and Roll Hall of Fame inductee Percy Sledge, who spent four weeks at number one with "When a Man Loves a Woman"; it also topped the all-genre Hot 100 chart and would prove to be his signature song, but was his only chart-topper.

Chart history

References

1966
United States RandB singles
1966 in American music